Cellular is a 2004 American action thriller film directed by David R. Ellis. The film stars Kim Basinger, Chris Evans, Jason Statham, William H. Macy with Noah Emmerich, Richard Burgi, Valerie Cruz and Jessica Biel. The screenplay was written by Chris Morgan, based on a story by Larry Cohen.

The film was released on September 10, 2004. It received mixed reviews from critics and grossed $57 million.

Plot
Science teacher Jessica Martin lives with her husband Craig and their son Ricky. One morning, after Jessica takes Ricky to the bus stop, intruders break into her house, slay her housekeeper, kidnap and confine her in an attic, and smash the landline. Jessica manages to use the wires of the broken phone to contact a random number.

Ryan is hanging out at Santa Monica Pier with his friend Chad when he comes across his ex, Chloe, who dumped him. Hoping to get back with her, he offers to help with the fundraiser being held there; he gets Chad to hand out the fliers until he returns with the t-shirts. On his way, Ryan gets a call on his cellphone, from Jessica who tells him she's been kidnapped and her phone is shattered.

Although Ryan thinks it's a prank, Jessica gets him to go to the police, where he reports it to Sergeant Bob Mooney. A fight between officers and gang members breaks out, Mooney intervenes and tells him to report the kidnapping on the fourth floor. However, Ryan can't find anyone on the way up, and will lose the call due to poor cell service if he continues up. Ethan, the leader of the kidnappers, asks Jessica for Craig's location. When she refuses to cooperate, he leaves to get Ricky. Overhearing them, Ryan realizes the kidnapping is real, hurries to Ricky's school, only to see the boy kidnapped. Hijacking a security officer's car, he gives chase, but loses them. As his phone battery is running low, he takes a gun in the car and uses it to steal a charger.

Checking on the kidnapping claim, Mooney visits Jessica's. Meeting Dana Bayback, the kidnappers' sole female accomplice posing as Jessica, leads him to believe it is a false alarm. With Ricky in tow, Ethan returns and asks Jessica where Craig is hiding. Jessica, fearing the kidnappers will kill them all once Craig is found, attacks him, but is overpowered and confesses it is a bar at LAX. Before he departs, a woman playing loud music in her car pulls up next to Ryan, but he silences his phone before Ethan realises.

A cross-connection between cell lines forces Ryan to take a nearby lawyer's car and his cell to maintain the connection. At the airport, he plants the gun on one of the kidnappers, triggering the alarm. When security intervenes, they show they are police officers for the LAPD and then detain Craig. Mooney sees a newsflash of Ryan holding up a store for the charger (and the car and phone jacking) and calls Jessica's house, realizing the voice on the answering machine is different from that of the woman he met at the house.

The kidnappers escort Craig to his bank safe deposit box to retrieve a bag, but Ryan intercepts it. While Ethan chases him, he drops and breaks the lawyer's cellphone. When he opens Craig's bag, he sees a video camera with a disturbing video of LAPD Detectives Ethan, Mad Dog, Dimitri, Dana Bayback, Deason, and Mooney's friend Jack Tanner, robbing, torturing, and murdering two drug dealers, exposing them all as dirty cops.

Ryan steals the lawyer's car again, from the police impound lot, and finds his own cellphone he left in the seat. Mooney returns to the Martins' to verify some things, where he kills Bayback in self-defense when she fires at him, grazing his neck. His friend, Tanner pulls up, hearing of the shootout, acting as a concerned friend. Back at the safe house, Mad Dog realizes Jessica has been using the landline seeking help. He attempts to kill her, but she nicks his brachial artery, causing him to bleed to death in seconds.

Tanner tells Ethan of Bayback’s death and the forensic team at the Martin’s house, looking for evidence. Before Jessica and Ricky can escape, they are caught by Ethan's gang, but Ryan contacts Ethan before he can hurt them and makes a deal: the videotape in exchange for the Martin family at Santa Monica Pier.

At the pier Ryan, in disguise, refuses to give up the camera until the Martins are freed, but Mooney and Tanner find him when Chloe inadvertently exposes him. Tanner sends Mooney away with Dimitri for medical attention, abducts Ryan, bringing him to Ethan. He crushes the videotape to pieces, and Tanner radios Deason to execute the Martins (although he decides to wait until their return to the safe house to avoid attention).

Mooney overhears the transmission, overpowers Dimitri and handcuffs him before returning to the pier. Ryan escapes to a boathouse, thanks to Chad's distraction, and Tanner and Ethan chase after him. He knocks Tanner out, but is overpowered by Ethan before Mooney shows up. After a brief altercation, Ryan sees Ethan approaching Mooney from behind and calls his cell. The ringtone exposes his position, and Mooney shoots him.

Jessica strangles Deason with her handcuff chain in the van, then frees her husband and son; however, he recovers and is attempting to kill them when Ryan intervenes, slamming his head in the car door. While Ryan and Mooney are being treated by paramedics, Tanner is also exposed, as Ryan had copied the whole video on his cellphone. Jessica finally meets Ryan, the man who risked his life to save her family, and Ryan humorously asks her to never call him again.

Cast

Production
Larry Cohen, screenwriter of the 2002 thriller film Phone Booth, conceived of Cellular while working for Sony Pictures. Cohen's original screenplay mimicked Phone Booth in its theme of a "narcissistically obsessed society" enamored with cell phones. Its story followed a 30- or 40-year-old man named Theo Novak who obtains a call from a woman named Lenore, who tells him that she and her husband have been abducted in a safehouse by a group of bank robbers. It is then revealed that Novak is an art thief who becomes wracked with guilt after unsuccessfully rescuing a friend from committing suicide in the past; he agrees to make a detour from a criminal undertaking and rescue Lenore. During the rescue Novak is unsuccessful, but later discovers a conspiracy involving Lenore and her accomplices over another crime they are involved withultimately, Novak gains the upper hand, killing Lenore and her accomplices and obtains their loot in the process, which leaves him therefore a wealthy man.

Sony Pictures' then Vice President Lauren Lloyd was drawn to Cohen's script and thought of pitching it to fellow executives, but was unsuccessful in doing so. She then left Sony to produce the project independently. Lloyd sent the script to her colleague producer Dean Devlin and pledged to develop it together. Aiming for a story straightforward and devoid of bitterness and cynicism present in Cohen's version, the pair hired screenwriter Chris Morgan. Morgan had been passionate about crafting "a story about how an everyday person can become heroic when faced with a certain set of trying circumstances", and he incorporated that in Cellular. In an attempt to segue the script's predominant action and thriller elements with situational comedy, as well as appeal to young audiences, Morgan took inspiration from the comical attributes of the fictional character Indiana Jones:

Music

The soundtrack for the movie was composed by John Ottman and released on October 5, 2004 via La-La Land Records label.

Track listing

Release

Home media
Cellular was released on VHS and DVD on January 18, 2005. The film was later released on Blu-ray on July 17, 2012 by New Line Home Entertainment.

Reception

Box office
Cellular grossed $32 million in the U.S. and Canada and $25.7 million in international markets, for a total of $57.7 million worldwide.

Critical response
On review aggregator website Rotten Tomatoes, 55% of 149 surveyed critics gave the film a positive review; the average rating is 5.76/10. The site's critics consensus reads: "Though it's gimmicky and occasionally feels like a high-end cell phone ad, Cellular is also an energetic and twisty thriller." Metacritic, another review aggregator, gave the film a score of 60 out of 100 based on 29 critics, indicating "mixed or averaged reviews". Audiences polled by CinemaScore gave the film an average grade of "B+" on an A+ to F scale.

Entertainment Weekly called the film "pure chase-thriller excitement", and Claudia Puig of USA Today called it a "well-paced action film in the vein of Speed". Roger Ebert rated it three and half stars and called it "one of the year's best thrillers".

Kim Basinger was nominated for Best Supporting Actress at the 31st Saturn Awards.

Other media

Novelization
A novelization of the film was written by Pat Cadigan and released in October 2004 by Black Flame.

Remakes
The 2007 Bollywood film Speed is an adaption of Cellular directed by Vikram Bhatt. The film stars Zayed Khan, Sanjay Suri, Urmila Matondkar, Aftab Shivdasani and Aashish Chaudhary.

The 2007 Malayalam movie Hello draws the plot of kidnap and phone call to a random number from Cellular.

In 2008, a Hong Kong remake of the film entitled Connected was co-written, produced and directed by Benny Chan. The film stars Louis Koo, Barbie Shu, Nick Cheung and Liu Ye.

In 2009, a Tollywood remake of the film entitled Risk was directed by Riingo Banerjee. The film stars Hiran Chatterjee, Rajesh Sharma, Rituparna Sengupta, Priyanka Sarkar and Subhasish Mukhopadhyay.

References

External links

 
 
  
 
 
 
 

2004 films
2004 action thriller films
2004 crime thriller films
American action thriller films
American crime thriller films
Films scored by John Ottman
Films about kidnapping
Films about mobile phones
Films directed by David R. Ellis
Films set in Los Angeles
Films shot in Los Angeles
Films with screenplays by Chris Morgan
Films about police misconduct
2000s English-language films
New Line Cinema films
2000s American films